Ente Ummante Peru is a 2018 Indian Malayalam-language road comedy-drama film directed by Jose Sebastian and co-written by Sebastian and Sarath R. Nath. The film stars Tovino Thomas and Urvashi. The story is set in northern Kerala (Malabar region) and moves to Lucknow in the later part.

Plot
Hamid's father Haider is his only relative as he does not know anything about his mother. His father never responds to questions about his mother. Other important people in his life are his father's friend Hamzakoya and his friend Beeran.

One day, Hamid is at a marriage party with Beeran and Beeran is suddenly called by Hamzakoya. He informs Beeran that Hamid's father just died. The death of his father makes Hamid sad since he believes that he now has no family, even though Beeran and Hamzakkoya tells him that they are with him. To pull him out of his loneliness, Hamzakkoya and Beeran advise him to get married.

He meets Sainaba. Even though Hamid and Sainaba likes each other, Sainaba's father does not want them to marry, stating that Hamid is an orphan. This makes Hamid even sadder. He continues his life looking after his antiques shop with Beeran.

One day while clearing junk from his house he finds his father's will, which states that Hamid's father had 2 wives, one in Kozhikode and another in Ponnani. It said that Haider's land must be split into three and two parts must be given to his two wives and one to charity. Hamid sells the land and decides to visit the two widows to give them their inheritance, hoping that one of them would turn out to be his mother.

He travels to Kozhikode to meet Ramlath with Beeran. On reaching Kozhikode he meets Shivan a former employee of his father. He asks him about his mother, but does not get promising answers. On reaching Ramlath's house they are shooed away by her arrogant husband after Hamid tells him that he is Haidar's son. The next day they catch the husband with another woman. They pressurize him and he agrees to let them meet Ramlathumma. Hamid hands over her share of the land but confirms that she is not his mother and thus he confirms that Aishumma in Ponnani should be his mother. He set off to Ponnani to meet her. He meets Aishumma and takes her home.

Though she is kind and caring with Hamid, she was not so with Hamzakoya and Beeran. They are unhappy about Aishumma's arrogant nature and Hamzakoya visits Ponnani to gather information about her. He learns that she is not Hamid's mother. He then while sitting inside his antique shop, a customer comes to buy records for gramophone. He accidentally discovers a postcard inside a record cover. While trying to discuss the price, Hamid gives him the record for free. Since the letter was written in Urdu, he gets it read and explained to him that the letter was sent by Laila Begum, from Firdous Quila, Lucknow. He then plans to visit Lucknow to find out. Aishumma bluffs that she had been to Lucknow 2–3 times with his father. He discovers while reaching Lucknow that she has taken him for a ride about her knowing of the place and it is her first visit. They then reach a lodge and settles down. While asleep, Aishumma steals and hides that post card. She then tries to force Hamid to show her around the city. Hamid tries to reach out to Sivankutty, to find a lead. Hamid gets an address from him about an antique shop. He writes it down in a piece of paper and starts to search the shop, since he does not know to read Urdu and Hindi. The story then leads to the final conclusion that Begum Laila was his mother and to confirm he finds that his look-alike son comes riding a motorcycle. But she is now married and has her son getting married next day. He leaves the place tearing off the post card for good and return to his home with accepting Aishumma as his own mother. His friend Beeran calls up and informs that Sainabas father has died and now he can marry her and the film ends.

Cast

 Tovino Thomas as Ḥamīd Hyderali / Ḥamīd's twin
 Urvashi as Ā’ishah
 Hareesh Perumanna as Bīran
 Mammukoya as Ḥamzah Kōya
 Saara Deva as Sainaba
 Siddique as Zakker
 Shanthi Krishna as Ramlath 
 Dileesh Pothan as Shivankutty
 Ramu as Moideen
 Vijayan Karanthoor as Hassan ikka
 Raghavan as Raghavan
 Shilpa Tulaskar as Begum Laylah
 Renji Panicker as Mohammed Hyderali Mehfil 
 Unniraj Cheruvathur as Dance master
 Gokulan as Villager

Music

Production
Principal photography commenced in April 2018 and the first schedule was wrapped by end of April. The second schedule commenced in September and the filming was complete by October 2018. Gopi Sunder composed the music and background score.

Awards
 Urvashi - Vanitha Film Awards - Best Actress for Special Performance 
 Urvashi- Asianet Film Awards -  Best Actress for Special Performance 
 Urvashi- Creative Film Awards - Best Supporting Actress Award

References

External links
 

2010s road movies
Indian drama road movies
2010s Malayalam-language films
Films shot in Thalassery
Films shot in Kozhikode
Films shot in Lucknow